{{DISPLAYTITLE:C23H46N6O13}}
The molecular formula C23H46N6O13 (molar mass: 614.64 g/mol, exact mass: 614.3123 u) may refer to:

 Neomycin

Molecular formulas